Peasant Coffin is an oil painting by Polish artist Aleksander Gierymski, created in 1895.

Description
The painting shows a sad peasant couple sitting outside their house with a child-sized coffin nearby.

During his stay in Krakow in 1893 and 1894. Gierymski frequented Włodzimierz Tetmajer, who lived in Bronowice Małe. At that time Aleksander Gierymski drew first sketches for Peasant Coffin. This painting was the last of Gierymski's figural compositions. Later Gierymski painted only landscapes and vedutas. 

The painting is in the collection of the National Museum in Warsaw.

Atmosphere
Polish filmmaker Andrzej Wajda wrote: I don't know a picture in Polish art, where occurrence of tragedy is equally strong. Exactly tragedy, not drama. In this painting there is a sprit of ancient tragedy, which always reaches its conclusion, in full daylight, in front of the neighbours, in front of the house.

References

External links
Painting at the National Museum in Warsaw
Sketches of the old woman 
Sketches of the old man

1894 paintings
Paintings by Aleksander Gierymski
Paintings in the collection of the National Museum, Warsaw
Death in art
Dogs in art